Claude Patrik Gustaf de Laval (14 October 1886 – 29 October 1974) was a Swedish modern pentathlete and sport shooter who competed in the 1912 Summer Olympics. He finished 14th in the modern pentathlon and 13th in the 30 metre rapid fire pistol event. His brothers Erik and Georg also competed in shooting and pentathlon at the same Olympics.

References

1886 births
1974 deaths
Swedish male modern pentathletes
Swedish male sport shooters
Olympic modern pentathletes of Sweden
Olympic shooters of Sweden
Modern pentathletes at the 1912 Summer Olympics
Shooters at the 1912 Summer Olympics
Sportspeople from Stockholm
Swedish people of French descent